Karl or Carl Beck may refer to:

 Charles Beck (1798–1866), German-born American classical scholar
 Karl Beck (footballer)
 Karl Beck (tenor) (1814–1879), Austrian operatic tenor
 Karl Beck (soldier) (1911–1945), Oberst in the Wehrmacht during World War II
 Karl Isidor Beck (1817–1879), Austrian poet
 Carl Beck (1897–1963), American football player
 Carl Frederik Waage Beck (born 1979), Danish community activist and artist